Saber Khalifa (born 14 October 1986) is a Tunisian international footballer who plays for Club Africain as a winger and striker.

Club career
Born in Gabès, Khalifa has played in Tunisia, Libya and France for Stade Gabèsien, Espérance, Hammam-Lif, Al-Ahly.

He joined French club Evian Thonon Gaillard in 2011, and in 2013 he was a finalist in the Coupe de France when his side lost 2–3 to Bordeaux.

On 7 August 2013, Khalifa was linked with a move to Marseille, and he signed a four-year contract 2 days later. He stayed one season, playing 28 league matches and scoring once.

On 26 July 2014, Khalifa was loaned to Club Africain with an option to buy included in the deal.

In June 2016 Kalifa was linked with a move to Qatar to play for Al-Shahania Sports Club but this move eventually fell through. He spent time on loan with Kuwait SC in 2018.

On 14 January 2019, Emirates Club has signed  Khalfia for one seasons from Club Africain.

International career
Khalifa made his senior international debut for Tunisia in 2010 against Botswana and has appeared in FIFA World Cup qualifying matches.

He was a member of Tunisia's squad at both the 2012 and 2013 Africa Cup of Nations tournaments.

Khalifa was recalled to the national team squad in October 2013, having been suspended for the previous month.

In December 2014 he was named as part of Tunisia's provisional squad for the 2015 African Cup of Nations.

He was named in Tunisia's final 23-man squad for the 2018 World Cup in Russia.

Career statistics

International

International goals
Scores and results list Tunisia's goal tally first.

Personal life
Upon signing with Marseille in August 2013, Khalifa's name was accidentally rendered as "Khlifa". In a video for Marseille's WebTV, he attributed this spelling mistake to the misconceived pronunciation of his name when he arrived in France.

References

Yoann Touzghar a résilié son contrat au Club Africain‚ lensois.com, 12 June 2016

1986 births
Living people
Tunisian footballers
Tunisian expatriate footballers
Tunisia international footballers
Stade Gabèsien players
Espérance Sportive de Tunis players
CS Hammam-Lif players
Thonon Evian Grand Genève F.C. players
Olympique de Marseille players
Ligue 1 players
2012 Africa Cup of Nations players
2013 Africa Cup of Nations players
Association football wingers
Association football forwards
Tunisian expatriate sportspeople in Libya
Expatriate footballers in Libya
Tunisian expatriate sportspeople in France
Expatriate footballers in France
Al-Ahly SC (Benghazi) players
2015 Africa Cup of Nations players
2017 Africa Cup of Nations players
Tunisian Ligue Professionnelle 1 players
UAE Pro League players
2018 FIFA World Cup players
Club Africain players
People from Gabès
Kuwait SC players
Emirates Club players
Tunisian expatriate sportspeople in Kuwait
Expatriate footballers in Kuwait
Tunisian expatriate sportspeople in the United Arab Emirates
Expatriate footballers in the United Arab Emirates
Kuwait Premier League players
Libyan Premier League players